The 53d Wing is a wing of the United States Air Force based at Eglin Air Force Base, Florida. The wing reports to the United States Air Force Warfare Center at Nellis Air Force Base, Nevada, which in turn reports to Headquarters Air Combat Command.

The 53d Wing serves as the focal point for the combat air forces in electronic warfare, armament and avionics, chemical defense, reconnaissance, and aircrew training devices.  The wing is also responsible for operational testing and evaluation (OT&E) of new equipment and systems proposed for use by these air forces.  Current wing initiatives include advanced self-protection systems for combat aircraft, aircrew life support systems, aerial reconnaissance improvements, new armament and weapons delivery systems, and improved maintenance equipment and logistics support.  The 53d Wing, which consists of four groups, numbers almost 2,000 military and civilians at 17 locations throughout the United States.

Units

 53d Test and Evaluation Group
 28th Test and Evaluation Squadron
 59th Test and Evaluation Squadron
 85th Test and Evaluation Squadron
 88th Test and Evaluation Squadron
 418th Test and Evaluation Squadron
 422nd Test and Evaluation Squadron
 556th Test and Evaluation Squadron
 Operational Flight Program Combined Test Force
 53d Weapons Evaluation Group
 53d Test Support Squadron
 81st Air Control Squadron 
 82d Aerial Targets Squadron
 83d Fighter Weapons Squadron Combat Archer
 86th Fighter Weapons Squadron Combat Hammer

 753d Test and Evaluation Group
 15th Test and Evaluation Squadron 
 29th Training Systems Squadron 
 31st Test and Evaluation Squadron
 49th Test and Evaluation Squadron
 53rd Computer Systems Squadron
 72d Test and Evaluation Squadron 
 337th Test and Evaluation Squadron 
 410th Test and Evaluation Squadron 
 417th Test and Evaluation Squadron

History

World War II
The group was activated in 1941 as the 53d Pursuit Group with the 13th, 14th, and 15th Pursuit Squadrons assigned. The 53d trained fighter pilots with Seversky P-35 and Curtiss P-40 Warhawk aircraft from its activation until December 1941. After the United States entered World War II the group moved to the Panama Canal Zone to fly patrols in defense of the Panama Canal. In conjunction with the move, the group converted to Bell P-39 Airacobra aircraft. There it was redesignated as the 53d Fighter Group. The group returned to Florida in November 1942, where it became a Replacement Training Unit (RTU) training replacement fighter pilots.  RTUs were oversized units whose mission was to train individual pilots or aircrews. It used P-39s until June 1943 and Republic P-47 Thunderbolts thereafter. In early 1943, the group added a fourth squadron, the 438th Fighter Squadron.

The AAF found that standard military units, based on relatively inflexible tables of organization were proving less well adapted to the training mission.  Accordingly, a more functional system was adopted in which each base was organized into a separate numbered unit. The group was disbanded in as a result of this reorganization in 1944 and its personnel, equipment and mission were assumed by the 338th AAF Base Unit (Replacement Training Unit, Fighter).

Cold War Air Defense
The group was reconstituted, redesignated as the 53d Fighter Group (Air Defense) and activated to replace the 521st Air Defense Group at Sioux City Municipal Airport as part of Air Defense Command's Project Arrow to bring back on the active list fighter units that had achieved memorable records in the two World Wars. The 14th Fighter-Interceptor Squadron (FIS), already at Sioux City transferred from the 521st, while the 13th FIS moved to Sioux City to replace the 519th FIS. Both squadrons flew rocket armed and radar equipped F-86D Sabres. Between August 1955 and April 1960 the 53d served as an air defense unit, participating in North American Air Defense Command (NORAD) exercises and testing automated air defense systems. It also was the host organization for the USAF and was assigned several support units to carry out this function. In the fall of 1957 both of the group's squadrons upgraded their Sabres to F-86L models with data link for interception control through the Semi-Automatic Ground Environment system. In July 1959 the 13th FIS moved to Glasgow AFB, Montana and was reassigned.  The group and its remaining components were inactivated in 1960. In 1985, the group was redesignated as the 53d Tactical Fighter Group, but it was never active under that designation.

Test and Evaluation
The USAF Tactical Air Warfare Center was activated in 1963 to improve use of USAF tactical aviation in support of ground forces by operationally testing weapon systems and tactics for the joint U.S. Strike Command.  It employed a cross-section of tactical aircraft from Tactical Air Command (TAC) bases across the country. During the Vietnam War it tested tactical weapons systems and tactics for use in Southeast Asia. After the war it continued operational testing of new tactical aviation weapon systems. In 1977 the center began an annual series of Air Force-wide exercises to improve command, control, communications, and intelligence (C3I) techniques. Around the same time it embarked on the electronic warfare evaluation program, and continued OT&E of aviation weapon systems for TAC and later Air Combat Command, the Department of Defense, and the North Atlantic Treaty Organization. From 1983 to present, responsible for the operational testing and evaluation (OT&E) of all Air Force aircraft/weapons systems, and providing range control for live-firing missile programs on the Gulf range and aerial targets, using full scale and subscale drones. In September 1995, the 53d Tactical Fighter Group and USAF Air Warfare Center were consolidated and the consolidated unit was redesignated as the 53d Wing the following month.

In 2021 on the activation of the 350th Spectrum Warfare Wing, the 53rd Electronic Warfare Group was inactivated, broken up, and its units transferred to the new wing.

Lineage
Group
 Constituted as the 53d Pursuit Group (Interceptor) on 20 November 1940
 Activated on 15 January 1941
 Redesignated as the 53d Fighter Group on 15 May 1942
 Disbanded on 1 May 1944
 Reconstituted and redesignated as the 53d Fighter Group (Air Defense), on 20 June 1955
 Activated on 18 August 1955
 Discontinued on 1 April 1960
 Redesignated as the 53d Tactical Fighter Group on 31 July 31, 1985
 Consolidated with the USAF Air Warfare Center on 25 September 1995 (consolidated unit designated the USAF Air Warfare Center)

Center
 Designated and organized as the USAF Tactical Air Warfare Center on 1 November 1963
 Redesignated as the USAF Air Warfare Center on 1 October 1991
 Consolidated with the 53d Tactical Fighter Group on 25 September 1995

Consolidated Wing
 Redesignated as the 53d Wing on 1 October 1995

Assignments 
 22d Pursuit Wing, 15 January 1941
 3d Interceptor (later III Fighter) Command, 2 October 1941
 Caribbean (later, Sixth) Air Force, 1 January 1942
 26th Interceptor (later, 26th Fighter, XXVI Fighter) Command, 6 March 1942
 III Fighter Command, 26 November 1942 – 1 May 1944
 31st Air Division, 18 August 1955
 20th Air Division, 1 March 1956
 Kansas City Air Defense Sector, 1 January 1960 – 1 April 1960
 Tactical Air Command, 1 November 1963
 Air Combat Command, 1 June 1992
 United States Air Force Warfare Center, 1 October 1985 – present

Stations 
 MacDill Field, Florida, 15 January 1941
 Dale Mabry Field, Tallahassee, Florida, 8 May 1941 – 8 December 1941
 Howard Field, Panama Canal Zone, 1 January 1942 – 10 November 1942
 Dale Mabry Field, Florida, 26 November 1942
 Drew Field, Tampa, Florida, 7 January 1943
 Fort Myers Army Air Field (later Page Field, Florida, 6 February 1943 – 1 May 1944
 Sioux City Municipal Airport, Iowa, 18 August 1955 – 1 April 1960)
 Eglin Air Force Base, Florida, 1 November 1963 – present

Components

Wing 
 4485th Test Wing: 16 March 1964 – 30 June 1965

Groups 
 41st Training Group (see 4441st Tactical Training Group)
 53rd Electronic Warfare Group: November 1998 - 25 June 2021 (formed from personnel and assets of 68th Electronic Combat Group)
 53d Test and Evaluation Group (see 4443d Test and Evaluation Group)
 53d Test Management Group: 1 October 2002 – 1 October 2021
 53d Weapons Evaluation Group (See 475th Weapons Evaluation Group)
 57th Test Group: 1 October 1996 – 1 August 1997
 68th Electronic Combat Group: activated 15 April 1993, inactivated on 20 November 1998 (personnel and assets to 53rd Electronic Warfare Group) 
 79th Test and Evaluation Group (see 4443d Test and Evaluation Group)
 475th Weapons Evaluation Group (later 53d Weapons Evaluation) Group: 23 January 1991 – present
 505th Air Control Group (see 4442nd Tactical Control Group0
 753d Test and Evaluation Group: 1 October 2021 – present
 4441st Tactical Training Group (Blue Flag) (later 41st Training Group): 1 March 1977 – 15 April 1993
 4442nd Tactical Control Group (later 505th Air Control Group, 505th Command and Control Evaluation Group): 1 March 1980 – 1 October 1997
 4443d Test and Evaluation Group (later 79th Test and Evaluation Group, 53d Test and Evaluation Group): 1 July 1988 – present

Squadrons 
 Fighter Squadrons
 13th Pursuit Squadron (later 13th Fighter Squadron, 13th Fighter-Interceptor Squadron): 15 January 1941 – 1 May 1944; 18 August 1955 – 1 July 1957.
 14th Pursuit Squadron (later 14th Fighter Squadron, 14th Fighter-Interceptor Squadron): 15 January 1941 – 1 May 1944; 18 August 1955 – 1 April 1960.
 15th Pursuit Squadron (later 15th Fighter Squadron): 15 January 1941 – 1 May 1944
 438th Fighter Squadron: 20 February 1943 – 1 May 1944

 Test Squadrons
 31st Test and Evaluation Squadron: 1 June 1992 – 15 April 1993
 49th Test Squadron: 1 June 1992 – 15 April 1993
 513th Test Squadron: 1 June 1992 – 15 April 1993
 727th Tactical Control Squadron (Test): 1 October 1979 – 1 March 1980
 3907th Systems Evaluation Squadron: 1 June 1992 – 15 April 1993
 4484th Fighter Weapons Squadron: 1 October 1978 – 1 June 1984
 4484th Test Squadron: 15 October 1983 – 1 August 1988
 4485th Test Squadron: 12 April 1971 – 1 August 1988
 4486th Fighter Weapons Squadron: 1 October 1985 – 1 August 1988, later 86th Fighter Weapons Squadron
 4487th Electronic Warfare Aggressor (later 87th Electronic Warfare Aggressor) Squadron: 1 October 1990 – 15 April 1993

Flight
 15th Test Flight: 1 March 2016 – 1 October 2021

Support Units
 53d USAF Infirmary (later 53d USAF Dispensary), 18 August 1955 – 1 April 1960
 53d Air Base Squadron, 18 August 1955 – 1 April 1960
 53d Materiel Squadron, 18 August 1955 – 1 April 1960
 53d Consolidated Aircraft Maintenance Squadron, 8 July 1957 – 1 May 1959

Aircraft flown 

 P-35 (1941)
 P-39 Airacobra (1942–1943)
 P-40 Warhawk (1941)
 P-47 Thunderbolt (1943–1944)
 P-51 Mustang (1943)
 F-86 Sabre (1955–1959)
 C-119 Flying Boxcar (1956, 1963–1973)
 C-45 Expeditor (1957)
 T-33 Shooting Star (1957, 1963–1973)
 A-4 Skyhawk (1963–1973)
 A-37 Dragonfly (1963–1973)
 B-57 Canberra (1963–1973)

 C-123 Provider (1963–1973)
 C-124 Globemaster II (1963–1973)
 H-3 Sea King (1963–1973)
 CH-21 Shawnee (1963–1973)
 F-100 Super Sabre (1963–1973)
 F-101 Voodoo (1963–1973)
 F-104 Starfighter (1963–1973)
 F-105 Thunderchief (1963–1973)
 O-1 Bird Dog (1963–1973)
 OV-10 Bronco (1963–1973)
 RB-66 Destroyer (1963–1973)
 UH-1 Iroquois (1963–1973)

 C-130 Hercules (1964–1974)
 F-111 Aardvark (1968–1978)
 RF-4 (1964–1994)
 F-5 Freedom Fighter (1965–1978)
 A-7 Corsair II (1972–1974)
 AC-130 Spectre (1972–1978)
 McDonnell Douglas F-15 Eagle (1976–present)
 General Dynamics F-16 Fighting Falcon (1978–present)
 Fairchild Republic A-10 Thunderbolt II (1978–present)
 Boeing E-3 Sentry (1980)

 SR-71 Blackbird (1986–89)
 F-15 Strike Eagle (1988-present)
 E-9 (1996–present)
 F-117 Nighthawk (1996–2008)
 HH-60 Pave Hawk (1996–present)
 HC-130J Combat King II (2010–present)
 F-22A Raptor (2010-present)
 F-35A Lightning II (2014-present)
 F-15EX Eagle II (2021-present)

Awards and campaigns

References

Notes
 Explanatory notes

 Citations

Bibliography

 Buss, Lydus H.(ed), Sturm, Thomas A., Volan, Denys, and McMullen, Richard F., History of Continental Air Defense Command and Air Defense Command July to December 1955, Directorate of Historical Services, Air Defense Command, Ent AFB, CO, 1956.

External links
53d Wing Home Page

Military units and formations in Florida
0053
Military units and formations established in 1941